The Râpa is a right tributary of the river Vișa in Romania. It flows into the Vișa in Șeica Mare.

References

Rivers of Romania
Rivers of Sibiu County